The Cabinet of the Republic of Indonesia is part of the executive branch of the Indonesian government. It is composed of the most senior appointed officers of the executive branch of the government serving under the president. Members of the Cabinet (except for the vice president) serve at the pleasure of the president, who can dismiss them at will for no cause.

Indonesia has seen dozens of cabinets since independence in 1945. Although after the New Order most cabinets remained unchanged for five years at a time. Most cabinets are referred to by the names given them at the time of formation. The current presidential cabinet is the Onward Indonesia Cabinet of Joko Widodo.

History
The concept of a cabinet is not mentioned explicitly in the 1945 Constitution, so Indonesia's cabinets since 14 November 1945 are the result of administrative convention. There have been two types of cabinet in Indonesian history; presidential and parliamentary. In presidential cabinets, the president is responsible for government policy as head of state and government, while in parliamentary cabinets, the cabinet carries out government policy, and is responsible to the legislature.

During the War of Independence from 1945 to 1949, the cabinet changed from a presidential to a parliamentary system, despite this not being the system intended by those who drew up the Constitution; however, at several critical periods, it reverted to a presidential system. During this period, the cabinet had between 16 and 37 ministers with 12-15 ministries.

On 27 December 1949, the Netherlands recognised the sovereignty of the United States of Indonesia (RIS). Under the Federal Constitution of 1949, the RIS had a parliamentary cabinet as ministers were responsible for government policy. With the return to the unitary state of Indonesia in August 1950, the parliamentary cabinet system remained due to an agreement between the governments of the RIS and the Republic of Indonesia (a constituent of the RIS). Article 83 of the Provisional Constitution of 1950 stated that ministers had full responsibility for government policy. Over the following nine years there were seven cabinets with between 18 and 25 members.

On 5 July 1959, President Sukarno issued a decree abrogating the 1950 Constitution and returning to the 1945 Constitution. The cabinet was also dissolved. A new presidential cabinet was formed shortly after, but this new cabinet did not follow the 1945 Constitution either, as the office of prime minister still existed, along with deputy prime ministers. Moreover, the offices of Chief Justice of the Supreme Court of Indonesia and Speaker of the People's Representative Council which were supposed to be equal to the president, and the office of Chairman of the People's Consultative Assembly, which was supposed to be above all government branches, were included into the Cabinet. During the final years of Sukarno's presidency, cabinets were larger, peaking at 111 ministers.

During the New Order under President Suharto, cabinets were smaller, and from 1968 until 1998 lasted for the five-year presidential term. Offices that were not sanctioned by the 1945 Constitution were abolished. Following the fall of Suharto and the beginning of the Reformasi era, the presidential cabinet system has been retained.

Until 2010, cabinet ministries were dubbed 'Departments' (Departemen) following the United States model. After 2010, all 'departements' were renamed into 'ministries' (Kementerian), thus bringing them in line with the Netherlands model of ministries and a state secretariat.

List of Indonesian Cabinets 
Parliamentary cabinets were usually known by the name of the prime minister, but after 1959 they were named after their principal tasking.  The complete list of cabinets follows:

Current cabinet

The present Indonesian cabinet, the Onward Indonesia Cabinet, was sworn in on 23 October 2019. The cabinet consists of 34 ministers.

Coordinating Ministers

Ministers

Cabinet-level officials

See also

List of female cabinet ministers of Indonesia
List of longest-serving ministers in Indonesia
List of government ministries of Indonesia

References
 Daniel Dhaidae & H. Witdarmono (Eds) (2000)Wajah Dewan Perwakilan Rakyat Republic Indonesia Pemilihan Umum 1999 (Faces of the Republic of Indonesia People's Representative Council 1999 General Election) Harian Kompas, Jakarta, 
 Feith, Herbert (2007) The Decline of Constitutional Democracy in Indonesia  Equinox Publishing (Asia) Pte Ltd, 
 
 
 Yayasan API (2001),Panduan Parlemen Indonesia (Indonesian Parliamentary Guide),

Notes

External links
 Indonesian Cabinet 1945 – 2001, Indonesian Embassy in the United Kingdom

Indonesia
Government of Indonesia